Pyrgos (also Πύργος Τριφυλίας - Pyrgos Trifylias) is a village in the municipality Trifylia, Peloponnese, Greece. Between 1912 and 1997, when it joined Gargalianoi, it was an independent community.

The village has one elementary school and one kindergarten, 7 churches, a central square with many cafe and bars, post office, and a super market.  The sporting facility is to the west, named "Miltiadis Stadium".

The village is surrounded with hills covered with olive trees and grapevines.

Historical population

References

See also
List of settlements in Messenia

Populated places in Messenia